Gabriel Rufián Romero (born 8 February 1982) is a Spanish politician. In the Spanish general election of 2015 he led the Republican Left of Catalonia, a pro-independence electoral party. He is also a member of the secretariat of the Assemblea Nacional Catalana and a member of Súmate, two other pro-independence groups.

In the 2016 general election, he was elected to the Spanish Cortes Generales for the constituency of Barcelona. On 20 September 2017, in support of the Catalan referendum on independence on 1 October, he told Mariano Rajoy to "take his dirty hands off Catalan institutions", after the Judiciary of Spain arrested several Catalan politicians as part of Operation Anubis. Later he and several other Catalan politicians walked out of the parliament in protest.

In September 2018, Rufián was part of a one-hour question time directed towards the premier José María Aznar.

References

External links

 

1982 births
Living people
Pompeu Fabra University alumni
Politicians from Barcelona
Members of the 12th Congress of Deputies (Spain)
Members of the 13th Congress of Deputies (Spain)
Members of the 14th Congress of Deputies (Spain)